Colleen Fahey is a former female American rugby union player. She won the 50–54 Masters age division at the 2013 CrossFit Games and third in the 2018 CrossFit Games 55–59 division.

References

Living people
United States women's international rugby union players
American female rugby union players
Year of birth missing (living people)
Place of birth missing (living people)
CrossFit athletes
21st-century American women